Staunton is an independent city in the U.S. Commonwealth of Virginia. As of the 2020 census, the population was 25,750. In Virginia, independent cities are separate jurisdictions from the counties that surround them, so the government offices of Augusta County are in Verona, which is contiguous to Staunton. Staunton is a principal city of the Staunton-Waynesboro Metropolitan Statistical Area, which had a 2010 population of 118,502. Staunton is known for being the birthplace of Woodrow Wilson, the 28th U.S. president, and as the home of Mary Baldwin University, historically a women's college. The city is also home to Stuart Hall, a private co-ed preparatory school, as well as the Virginia School for the Deaf and Blind. It was the first city in the United States with a fully defined city manager system.

History

The area was first settled in 1732 by John Lewis and family. Surveyor Thomas Lewis in 1746 laid out the first town plat for Beverley of what was originally called Beverley's Mill Place. Founded in 1747, it was renamed in honor of Lady Rebecca Staunton, wife to Royal Lieutenant-Governor Sir William Gooch. Because the town was located at the geographical center of the colony (which then included West Virginia), Staunton served between 1738 and 1771 as regional capital for much of what was later known as the Northwest Territory, with the westernmost courthouse in British North America prior to the Revolution. By 1760, Staunton was one of the major "remote trading centers in the backcountry" which coordinated the transportation of the vast amounts of grain and tobacco then being produced in response to the change of Britain from a net exporter of produce to an importer. Staunton thus played a crucial role in the mid 18th century expansion of the economies of the American Colonies which, in turn, contributed to the success of the American Revolution. It served as capital of Virginia in June 1781, when state legislators fled Richmond and then Charlottesville to avoid capture by the British.

Like most of colonial Virginia, slavery was present in Staunton. For instance, in 1815, a slave named Henry ran away from John G. Wright's Staunton plantation. Wright placed an ad in the Daily National Intelligencer in Washington, D.C. seeking Henry's return. It notes that Henry was an excellent cook and was widely travelled, having been as far as the West Indies.

The Civil War and immediately prior

In August 1855, President Franklin Pierce visited Staunton.  He gave a speech at the Virginia Hotel, in which he stated that his "feelings revolted from the idea of a dissolution of the union."  He said that "[i]t would be the Iliad of innumerable woes, from the contemplation of which he shrank."

Located along the Valley Pike, Staunton developed as a trade, transportation and industrial center, particularly after the Virginia Central Railroad arrived in 1854. Factories made carriages, wagons, boots and shoes, clothing and blankets. In 1860, the Staunton Military Academy was founded. By 1860, Staunton had at least one pro-Union, pro-slavery (the Staunton Spectator) and at least one pro-secession, pro-slavery newspaper (the Staunton Vindicator).  The Spectator ran editorials before the war urging its citizens to vote for union, while the Vindicator ran, e.g., stories reporting on "unruly" slaves mutilating themselves to escape being sold.

On May 23, 1861, shortly after the firing on Fort Sumter began the American Civil War, Virginians voted on whether to ratify articles of secession from the Union and join the Confederate States. The articles were overwhelmingly approved throughout the Commonwealth, even in the majority of the counties that would later become West Virginia. The vote in Staunton was 3300 in favor of secession, with only 6 opposed.  During the war, the town became an important Shenandoah Valley manufacturing center, a staging area, and a supply depot for the Confederacy.

On June 6, 1864, Union Major General David Hunter arrived with 10,000 troops to cut supply, communication and railway lines useful to the Confederacy. The next day, they destroyed the railroad station, warehouses, houses, factories and mills. Union soldiers looted the stores and warehouses and confiscated supplies.

Post-bellum Staunton
On July 10, 1902, Staunton became an independent city.

In 1908, Staunton adopted the city manager form of government. Charles E. Ashburner was hired by Staunton as the nation's first city manager.

Western State Hospital

Staunton is also home to the former Western State Asylum, a hospital for the mentally ill, which originally began operations in 1828. The hospital was renamed Western State Hospital in 1894.

In its early days, the facility was a resort-style asylum. It had terraced gardens where patients could plant flowers and take walks, roof walks to provide mountain views, and many architectural details to create an atmosphere that would aid in the healing process.  However, by the mid 19th Century, this utopian model of care had vanished, replaced by overcrowding in the facility and the warehousing of patients.  Techniques such as "ankle and wrist restraints, physical coercion, and straitjackets" were used.  After the passage of the Eugenical Sterilization Act of 1924 in Virginia,  patients were forcibly sterilized at Western State until the law authorizing the practice was repealed in the 1970s.  Later, electroshock therapy and lobotomies were practiced at the facility.

When Western State vacated the property and moved its adult patients to its present site near Interstate 81, the facility was renamed the Staunton Correctional Center and turned into a medium-security men's penitentiary. The prison closed in 2003, and the site was left vacant for several years. In 2005, the state of Virginia gave the original property to the Staunton Industrial Authority.  It is now a condominium complex called The Villages at Staunton.

A separate complex, The DeJarnette State Sanatoruim, was constructed in 1932 and acted as a location for patients with the ability to pay for their treatment.  Dr. DeJarnette was the superintendent of the sanatorium from its opening until his retirement in 1947.

Geography
Staunton is located in the Shenandoah Valley in between the Blue Ridge and Allegheny Mountains of the Appalachian Mountains. It is drained by Lewis Creek. Lewis Creek flows into the Shenandoah River, which flows into the Potomac, and eventually to the Chesapeake Bay.

Climate
According to the Köppen Climate Classification system, Staunton has a humid subtropical climate, abbreviated "Cfa" on climate maps.

Governance 

Staunton operates under a council-manager form of government. In 1908, Staunton was the first city in the United States to give an appointed employee authority over city affairs through statute. In 1912, Sumter, South Carolina, was the first U.S. city to implement the council-manager form of city government.  The city of Staunton refers to itself on its website as the "birthplace of President Woodrow Wilson, and the city manager form of government."

Staunton is part of Virginia's 6th congressional district.

Sister cities
Vişeu de Sus, Romania.
Dabas, Hungary.

Demographics

2020 census

Note: the US Census treats Hispanic/Latino as an ethnic category. This table excludes Latinos from the racial categories and assigns them to a separate category. Hispanics/Latinos can be of any race.

2000 Census
As of the census of 2000, there were 23,853 people, 9,676 households, and 5,766 families residing in Staunton. The population density was 1,210.3 people per square mile (467.3/km2). There were 10,427 housing units at an average density of 529.1 per square mile (204.3/km2). The racial makeup of the city was 83.29% White, 13.95% Black or African American, 0.22% Native American, 0.46% Asian, 0.01% Pacific Islander, 0.52% from other races, and 1.55% from two or more races. Hispanic or Latino of any race were 1.11% of the population.

There were 9,676 households, out of which 24.9% had children under the age of 18 living with them, 44.4% were married couples living together, 11.7% had a female householder with no husband present, and 40.4% were non-families. 34.7% of all households were made up of individuals, and 14.3% had someone living alone who was 65 years of age or older. The average household size was 2.19 and the average family size was 2.81.

In the city, the population was spread out, with 19.8% under the age of 18, 10.2% from 18 to 24, 27.8% from 25 to 44, 24.1% from 45 to 64, and 18.0% who were 65 years of age or older. The median age was 40 years. For every 100 females, there were 89.1 males. For every 100 females age 18 and over, there were 87.0 males.

The median income for a household in the city was $32,941, and the median income for a family was $44,422. Males had a median income of $30,153 versus $22,079 for females. The per capita income for the city was $19,161. About 7.7% of families and 11.7% of the population were below the poverty line, including 15.9% of those under age 18 and 10.7% of those age 65 or over.

Economy

Top employers
According to Staunton's 2015 Comprehensive Annual Financial Report, the top employers in the city are:

Culture

Staunton is home to the American Shakespeare Center, a theatrical company centered at the Blackfriars Playhouse, a replica of Shakespeare's Blackfriars Theatre. In 2012, it also became the home of the Heifetz International Music Institute, named for renowned violinist Daniel Heifetz, a summer music school and festival dedicated to the artistic growth and career development of some of the World's most talented and promising classical musicians. The Woodrow Wilson Presidential Library is open for visitors, as well as the Museum of American Frontier Culture, which provides insight into life in early America.

The Staunton Music Festival – which celebrated its 20th year in 2017 – features multiple concerts each day, with programs of music from the Renaissance to the present.  The festival takes place during the early part of August annually.  All performances take place at historic venues in downtown Staunton.

The Queen City Mischief and Magic festival - which celebrated its 4th year in 2019 - is a new but quickly-growing festival for Harry Potter fans, attracting over 10,000 people in its 3rd year. Visitors from all over the east coast come to take part in games, events, and shopping throughout downtown. Businesses contribute the activities for the festival and the majority of West Beverly St is shut down for the weekend event.

Staunton is also the center of numerous galleries and art schools, the widely regarded Beverley Street Studio School and its associated Co-Art Gallery. In addition, Staunton is home to the Hypnagogia Film Collective, a collection of avant-garde experimental filmmakers.

Staunton is home to the Statler Brothers, country music legends who until 1994 performed free concerts at the annual Fourth of July celebration, accompanied by other country music artists.  Statler Brothers members Don Reid, Harold Reid, and Phil Balsley grew up in the city. Lew DeWitt was also a notable member of the Statlers who grew up in Staunton, VA.

Film
Downtown Staunton and Sherwood Avenue were used in the American Civil War film Gods and Generals. The local Shenandoah Valley Railroad as well as a number of nearby houses were used in filming of Hearts in Atlantis. In 1993,  a portion of the Showtime production of Assault at West Point: The Court-Martial of Johnson Whittaker was filmed here. In the summer of 2006, some scenes for the movie Evan Almighty were also filmed in Staunton. Some scenes for Familiar Strangers were also filmed in Staunton in 2007. In 2013, scenes from the documentary film Rita Dove: An American Poet were filmed in and around Staunton's Temple House of Israel synagogue.

Attractions 
Staunton is home to nearly 200 buildings designed by architect Thomas Jasper Collins (1844–1925), who worked in various styles during the Victorian era. His firm, T. J. Collins & Sons, is still in business.

The city was once home to about ten hotels, but only one of them is still in operation - Hotel 24 South. This hotel was renovated in the early 2000s, and is now in operation as both a hotel and a conference center. The Ingleside Resort is no longer in operation.  During World War II it was used by the INS as a detention center for enemy aliens held under Executive Order 9066. Some of the hotels that are no longer in operation are The Virginia Hotel, the Eakleton Hotel, the Valley Hotel, the American Hotel and the Hotel Beverley. All of these buildings are still standing except for the Virginia Hotel, which was demolished in 1930 to make way for a planned addition to the Stonewall Jackson Hotel which was never built. The New Street Parking Garage now stands on the site.

National Register of Historic Places 
Houses in Staunton on the National Register of Historic Places include:

 The Oaks, at 437 East Beverley Street. An 1840s structure, it was modified and enlarged in 1888 by famed Civil War cartographer Jedediah Hotchkiss. 
 Waverly Hill, a Georgian-revival house designed in 1929 by renowned architect William Bottomley with a landscape designed by Arthur Shurcliff.
 Sears House, a 'bracketed cottage' frame house built around 1860.

Parks and recreation
 Betsy Bell and Mary Gray Wilderness Parks — a  mountaintop park with a  observation platform
 Gypsy Hill Park — a  multi-use facility with a golf course, football and baseball stadiums, gymnasium, lake, two playgrounds, three youth baseball fields, public swimming pool, volleyball court, horseshoe pits, tennis courts, the Gypsy Express mini-train, the Duck Pond, a skatepark, a bandstand, and several pavilions.  Until the Staunton city parks were integrated, Gypsy Hill Park was only open to whites except for one day a year, which was set aside for other races to use the park.
 Montgomery Hall Park — a  multi-use facility with softball and soccer fields, tennis courts, disc golf course, playgrounds, picnic shelters, hiking and mountain biking trails, and a swimming pool (which was renovated in 2016 after being closed since 2010.) The offices of the Department of Parks and Recreation are at the Irene Givens Administration building, which also includes a kitchen, activity room, and conference room which are available for public use.  Montgomery Hall Park was opened in 1950 after much agitation by non-white residents of Staunton.  Before segregation ended in the mid-1960s, Montgomery Hall park was the only park in the city open to African-Americans
 Booker T. Washington Community Center — formerly the segregated Booker T. Washington High School, although according to the court which decided Bell v. Staunton Board of Education, the term "high school" was a misnomer, as the school also contained "first, second, and seventh grade classes and two special mentally retarded classes as well as the eighth through the twelfth grades."
 Nelson Street Teen Center — closed due to budget cuts.
Landes Park - a small, one-acre park names after Walter James Landes, Jr. in 1993. Near downtown Staunton.
Reservoir Hill Park - a small four acres park located at the old city reservoir.
Men's Green Thumb Park - approximately two acres and was created through a joint sponsorship by the Men's Green Thumb Garden Club and United Virginia Bank National Valley, 1960–1970.
Knowles Park - Knowles Park is a small parcel of land directly across from the main entrance of Gypsy Hill Park.
Woodrow Park (Sears Hill) - approximately five acres and is located in the Sears Hill District of Staunton. The park was named in honor of President Woodrow Wilson and features a scenic overlook of historic downtown Staunton.

Sports
In 1894, Staunton fielded a baseball team in the original Virginia League: The Staunton Hayseeds.  In 1914, the city fielded a team in the Virginia Mountain League: The Staunton Lunatics.  The Lunatics moved to Harrisonburg in July 1914, just before the league disbanded.  From 1939 to 1942, the city fielded a team in the second Virginia League: the Staunton Presidents.  Staunton currently has no minor league baseball, but the Staunton Braves represent the city in the Valley Baseball League, a collegiate summer baseball league that plays in the Shenandoah Valley.

Infrastructure

Transportation

Roads and highways

The main highways through Staunton include U.S. Route 11, U.S. Route 11 Business, U.S. Route 250, Virginia State Route 252, Virginia State Route 254, Virginia State Route 261 and Virginia State Route 262. U.S. Route 11 and U.S. Route 250 are the most prominent roads passing directly through Staunton, with US 11 following a northeast to southwest alignment (but signed north–south), and US 250 following a northwest to southeast alignment (but signed east–west). US 11 Business follows a slower route through downtown compared to the main US 11 routing which passes just outside downtown. State Routes 252 and 254 are minor roads leading to nearby rural areas of adjacent Augusta County. State Route 261 provides a better route for trucks following US 11 and US 250 through the city. State Route 262 forms a limited access beltway around the outskirts of Staunton. Interstate 64 and Interstate 81 both pass just outside the city limits and provide the main high-speed, high-volume roads to the Staunton region.

Public transportation

Staunton is served by Amtrak's Cardinal. The train station, which is located downtown, is the closest station to the nearby cities of Harrisonburg and Lexington. The Buckingham Branch also has a small railyard.

Staunton had a municipal bus system during the 20th century, known as the Staunton Transit Service, but it was dissolved in 1989.  In 1944, World War II veteran S. Melvin Johnson wrote to Truman Gibson, assistant to William H. Hastie, advisor to Secretary of War Henry L. Stimson, regarding segregated seating on the Staunton Transit Service and stating that returning African-American soldiers would not stand for such conditions. This letter was an indication of the role that African-American veterans would later play in the American civil rights movement.  In 1946, after the United States Supreme Court decision Irene Morgan v. Commonwealth of Virginia, which found that Virginia's segregated seating law was unconstitutional with respect to interstate bus routes, Ethel New, a black woman from Lynch, Kentucky, was arrested for violating the law because she had purchased an intrastate ticket.  New suffered a miscarriage subsequent to her arrest and sued Greyhound Lines and the arresting officer in Staunton. In September 1947, meeting in Staunton, the Virginia Supreme Court of Appeals upheld the all-white jury's verdict exonerating both the bus line and the officer.

Blue Ridge Intercity Transit Express (BRITE) provides fixed-route transit bus service in Staunton on three routes: the Downtown Trolley, West Route, and North Route. The Coordinated Area Transportation Services (CATS) operates a demand-response service throughout the Staunton area, as well as a fixed shuttle service between the downtown areas of Staunton and Waynesboro. Virginia Breeze provides intercity bus service between Blacksburg and Washington, with a stop in Staunton.

The city is adjacent to the northernmost junction of I-81 and I-64. Virginia State Route 262 forms a partial beltway around the city, and both US 250 and US 11 pass through the city.

The nearest commercial airport is Shenandoah Valley Regional Airport in Weyers Cave, Virginia.

Healthcare
 Commonwealth Center for Children and Adolescents (formerly the DeJarnette Center after eugenicist Joseph DeJarnette) psychiatric facility
 Western State Hospital (Virginia) psychiatric facility

Education

Staunton City Schools is the school district of the city.

Black Virginians were largely barred from education until Reconstruction.  The first school in Staunton which allowed African-Americans to attend was established by the Freedmen's Bureau under the supervision of the commanding general of the occupying Union army in late 1865.  Arrangements were made to bring in women from the North as teachers, and the jury rooms of the Augusta County Courthouse, located at 1 E. Johnson Street, were to be used as classrooms.  The court protested this plan, however, and it is possible that another location was found.

In 1964 the Staunton chapter of the NAACP threatened the city with a lawsuit if they did not immediately desegregate the public schools.  The City School Board, headed by Thomas W. Dixon, declined to take further action, contending that the schools were already desegregated as ten black children had been allowed to attend previously all-white schools. Attorneys for the city of Staunton submitted a plan for the desegregation of its public schools in 1965 by eliminating all negro schools in time for the 1967–1968 school year, which was approved by the Department of Health, Education and Welfare.  However, the implementation of this plan was delayed to such an extent that a group of African-American parents brought suit in the United States District Court for the Western District of Virginia against the city. This case, Bell v. School Board of Staunton, was decided on January 5, 1966, with the court stating that the delay was a violation of the rights of the students under the Fourteenth Amendment and ordering that the schools and their faculty be desegregated in time for the 1966–1967 school year.

The Staunton city school district was one of 21 in Virginia which take elementary school students out of class for Bible lessons on a voluntary basis, a practice known as Weekday Religious Education. Although the U.S. Supreme Court ended taxpayer-funded religious education in 1948 in McCollum v. Board of Education, four years later they opened the door to privately funded voluntary classes held during school hours but away from school premises in Zorach v. Clauson. In 2005, a group of parents in Staunton asked the school board to halt the practice.  The challenge was successful, and the Bible classes are no longer being taught as of April 2017.

Public
District schools:
 T.C. McSwain Elementary School
 A.R. Ware Elementary School
 Bessie Weller Elementary School
 Shelburne Middle School
 Staunton High School
 Dixon Educational Center (includes Genesis Alternative Education Program)
State-operated:
 Virginia School for the Deaf and Blind

Private
 Stuart Hall School—preparatory school (boarding for coed, day school for coed)
 Grace Christian School—Coed Christian School for Pre-K to 12th Grade
 C. F. Richards Jr. Academy—coed Seventh-Day Adventist school
 Mary Baldwin University—Private liberal arts college, formerly a women's college
 Raw Learning — democratic / free school

Former:
 Staunton Military Academy

Media
 The News Leader, local newspaper.  Owned by the Gannett Company.
 WHSV. ABC affiliate in Harrisonburg.
 WKDW-AM. Clear Channel Communications.
 WQSV-LP. Community radio station.

Notable people

 Diana Adams, dancer
 Charles W. Anderson, awarded the Medal of Honor
 John Brown Baldwin, legislator
 Mary Julia Baldwin, educator
 Phil Balsley, Baritone singer for The Statler Brothers
 Randolph C. Berkeley, major general in the United States Marine Corps and a Medal of Honor recipient
 Larry Boerner, baseball pitcher
 Allen Caperton Braxton, segregationist and Staunton representative to the revanchist Virginia state constitutional convention of 1902.
 John Breckinridge, senator and attorney general
 James Brown, 1st Secretary of State of Kentucky, U.S. Senator from Louisiana, U.S. Minister to France.
 Joseph Calhoun, congressman
 William Christian, soldier and politician
 Gertrude Harris Boatwright Claytor, poet
 George M. Cochran, Virginia Supreme Court Justice
 John E. Colhoun, senator and lawyer
 Francis Collins, Director of the National Institutes of Health
 Joseph DeJarnette, psychiatrist and eugenicist
 Lew DeWitt, Tenor singer for The Statler Brothers
 Joseph W. Fifer, governor of Illinois
 Dave Fultz, baseball center fielder
 Armistead C. Gordon, author, professor of English at the University of Virginia
 William Haines, film actor and interior designer
 Wade H. Haislip, United States Army general
 Emmett Hanger, politician
 Kenton Harper, printer, soldier and politician
 George Moffett Harrison, judge
 Alexander Hart, Confederate States Army major
 John N. Hendren, judge and treasurer of the Confederate States of America
 Henry W. Holt, chief justice of the Virginia Supreme Court of Appeals
 Thomas D. Howie, teacher and military officer
 Alexander Humphreys, physician
 Parry Wayne Humphreys, congressman
 Carroll Knicely, editor and publisher
 Shannon Lucas, drummer
 Sampson Mathews, soldier and politician
 Jerry Lee May, baseball catcher for the Pittsburgh Pirates and Kansas City Royals
 Samuel Augustus Merritt, delegate and judge
 James Coffield Mitchell, congressman
 Samuel Morgan, businessman, builder and manufacturer
 Ethel Moses, actress and dancer
 Eustace Mullins, white supremacist, anti-semite, conspiracy theorist, author, and publisher of Revelation Books
 Wilton Persons, chief assistant to Dwight D. Eisenhower and superintendent of Staunton Military Academy
 Louise M. Powell, American nurse  and educator who led the University of Minnesota School of Nursing, during its formative years.
 Don Reid, lead singer and songwriter for The Statler Brothers
 Harold Reid, bass singer for The Statler Brothers
 Reese Roper, lead singer for Five Iron Frenzy
 Larry Sheets, baseball outfielder and designated hitter
 John B. Stephenson, sociologist
 Alexander Hugh Holmes Stuart, congressman, secretary of the interior, and chairman of the Committee of Nine
 Jacob Swoope, politician
 Malfourd W. Trumbo, politician and judge
 A. J. Turner, teacher of music, first director of Stonewall Brigade Band
 Thomas Wilson, congressman
 Woodrow Wilson, 28th President of the United States
 Larry Woodall, baseball catcher
 Jacob Yost, congressman

See also
 National Register of Historic Places listings in Staunton, Virginia
 U.S. Route 11 Business

References

External links

 City of Staunton, Virginia
 Staunton Public Library
 Augusta County Historical Society & Museum
 Staunton Performing Arts Center
 Heifetz International Music Institute
 Staunton Music Festival 
 Staunton During the Civil War in Encyclopedia Virginia
 

 
County seats in Virginia
Populated places established in 1747
1747 establishments in Virginia
Cities in Virginia
Western Virginia
Augusta County, Virginia